Edward Montagu Stuart Granville Montagu-Stuart-Wortley-Mackenzie, 1st Earl of Wharncliffe (15 December 1827 – 13 May 1899), was a British peer and railway executive.

Early life
A member of the Stuart family headed by the Marquess of Bute, Wharncliffe was the eldest son of John Stuart-Wortley-Mackenzie, 2nd Baron Wharncliffe, and his wife Lady Georgiana Elizabeth, daughter of Dudley Ryder, 1st Earl of Harrowby.

Career
He succeeded his father in the barony in 1855. He was Chairman of Manchester, Sheffield and Lincolnshire Railway, which under his leadership became the Great Central Railway. In 1876 he was created Viscount Carlton, of Carlton in the West Riding in the County of York, and Earl of Wharncliffe, in the West Riding of the County of York, with remainder to his younger brother the Hon. Francis Dudley Stuart-Wortley-Mackenzie. In 1880 he assumed by Royal licence the additional surname of Montagu.

Personal life
Lord Wharncliffe married Lady Susan Charlotte, daughter of Henry Lascelles, 3rd Earl of Harewood, in 1855. They had no children. 

Lord Wharncliffe died in May 1899, aged 71, and was succeeded (in the viscountcy and earldom according to the special remainder) by his nephew Francis. The Countess of Wharncliffe died in May 1927.

Notes

References

|-

1827 births
1899 deaths
Earls in the Peerage of the United Kingdom
Edward
Great Central Railway people
Eldest sons of British hereditary barons
Peers of the United Kingdom created by Queen Victoria